The Perfect Arrangement is a 2022 Nigerian film co-produced by Inkblot Productions and FilmOne Entertainment and directed by Chinaza Onuzo. The film stars Sharon Ooja, Pere Egbi, Bovi, Adunni Ade, Funsho Adeolu, Mr Macaroni, Dorcas Shola Fapson, Rotimi Salami, Mimi Chaka, Wofai Fada, Ummi Baba Ahmed and many others. The movie hit the cinemas nationwide on May 13, 2022, following the premiere that held in Lagos on May 8, 2022.

Selected cast 

 Sharon Ooja as Tade Kalejaiye
 Bovi as Chidi Obikwe
 Pere Egbi as Cheta Obikwe
 Mr Macaroni as Oba Kalejaiye
 Dorcas Shola-Fapson as Sope-Bakare Kalejaiye
 Funsho Adeolu as Otunba Adeolu Kalejaiye
Adunni Ade as Victoria Otukpo
 Mimi Chaka as Abigail
 Temidayo Adenibuyan as Kels

Synopsis 
The Perfect Arrangement tells the story of Tade Kalejaiye played by Sharon Ooja, a young entrepreneur and daughter of a politician who decides to remove her family from bankruptcy by attempting to marry Chidi Obikwe played by Bovi who is also facing a political barricade after his sex tape was leaked online and that deterred his political ambition. Tade and Chidi who were in a relationship 5 years ago had to come back together in a staged relationship so as to salvage their respective problems. A love triangle situation ensued when Tade began to fall in love with Chidi and Cheta, Chidi's brother and Tade's best friend.

Premiere 
The Perfect Arrangement was premiered on Sunday, 8 May 2022 in Ikoyi, Lagos. The premiere was themed 'fun and flirty' and it featured so many Nollywood actors and actresses including those that didn't star in the movie, some of the celebrities in attendance were Banky W and Adesua Etomi, Ramsey Nouah, Judith Audu, Bimbo Ademoye, Nancy Isime, Mary Lazarus, Tope Olowoniyan, Uzor Arukwe, Osas Ighodaro, Stan Nze, Akay Mason, Ebenezer Eno, Charles Novia, Ibrahim Suleman and many more. Speaking during the premiere, the director made it known that the film was shot in Lagos and Abeokuta in 34 different location altogether.

References 

2022 films
Nigerian drama films
English-language Nigerian films
2020s English-language films